The Zygophyllales are an order of dicotyledonous plants, comprising the following two families:

 Family Zygophyllaceae
 Family Krameriaceae

According to the Angiosperm Phylogeny Group (APG II) both families are unplaced to order, but nevertheless included in the Eurosids I. The APG III system of 2009, however, recognized this order. Even if the monogeneric family Krameriaceae shares few common traits with the family Zygophyllaceae, researchers see little advantage in keeping it as a separate family (e.g. Sheahan and Chase). The name Zygophyllales can be used if one finds it appropriate to place both families into an order. The order remains unchanged in the APG IV system.

Under the Cronquist system, the Zygophyllaceae were included within the Sapindales, and the Krameriaceae within the Polygalales.

References

 
Angiosperm orders